The Redmond Formation is a geologic formation in Newfoundland and Labrador. It preserves fossils dating back to the mid-Cretaceous (Cenomanian). Argillite facies within the formation have produced a diverse flora and insect assemblage.

Fossil content

Mesoraphidiidae 
 Alloraphidia dorfi

Palaeoleontidae 
 Palaeoleon ferrogeneticus

Susumaniidae 
 Palaeopteron complexum

Coleoptera
 Coleoptera indet.

Labradorocoleidae 
 Labradorocoleus carpenteri

Cupedidae 
 Cupedidae indet.
 Haliplidae indet.
 Peltodytes sp.

Tettigarctidae 
 Maculaferrum blaisi

Dictyoptera 
 Cretatermes carpenteri
 Labradormantis guilbaulti

See also 
 List of fossiliferous stratigraphic units in Newfoundland and Labrador

References

Bibliography 

 
   

Geologic formations of Canada
Cretaceous Newfoundland and Labrador
Cenomanian Stage
Shale formations
Shallow marine deposits
Paleontology in Newfoundland and Labrador